Genziana liqueur or simply genziana is a liqueur, typical of several regions of Italy but especially Trentino and Alto Adige (as well as of parts of France, where it is called ), which is produced by distilling a maceration of the roots of the gentian (Gentiana lutea).

The name genziana is also used for a digestif, typical of the Abruzzo region in central Italy. It is also produced from the roots of the gentian but by steeping them in white wine rather than by any process involving distillation.

References

Italian liqueurs
Italian cuisine
Cuisine of Abruzzo